Boalmari is an upazila (sub-district) of Faridpur District in central Bangladesh, located in the Dhaka Division. It is named after its headquarters, the town of Boalmari.

Geography
Boalmari Upazila has a total area of 272.34 km2. It is bounded by Madhukhali Upazila and Faridpur Sadar Upazila on the north, Saltha Upazila on the east, Alfadanga Upazila, Barashia River & Kashiani Upazila on the south and the Madhumati River on the west. The Old Kumar River runs across the eastern side of the Upazila. The Nader Chand, Chapradah, and Chitlia beels are also principal to the Upazila.

History

The history of Boalmari dates back centuries. In the 16th century, the village of Satoir became a principal institution of Boalmari's Islamic civilization, aiding with the development of local society. It was home to several influential Sufi walis such as Shah Saturi. Saturi's murid was the Sultan of Bengal Alauddin Husain Shah, under whose instruction a congregational mosque was established in Satoir, later becoming a part of the Grand Trunk Road. In the 18th century, a mystic known as Dewan Saghir Shah gained popularity. He was based in Katagarh, where he was later buried in a mazar.

The thana (administrative police station) of Bhusna was moved to Saidpur in 1812. In 1814, a thana was established in the town of Boalmari comprising 19 unions. Later, the unions of Bana and Pachuria were given to Alfadanga Thana. During the Bangladesh Liberation War of 1971, a brawl took place between Bengali freedom fighters and the Pakistan Army in Natubdia Bazar on 9 December. Another battle took place in Chandpur and Dhopadanga which led to the deaths of 11 freedom fighters and 49 Pakistan-allied soldiers including Major Mafiz.

Boalmari Thana was granted Upazila status in 1983 as part of the erstwhile President of Bangladesh Hussain Muhammad Ershad's decentralization program.  However, 6 of its unions were given to the new Madhukhali Upazila.

Mythology
Boalmari has a legendary folk culture. It is said that in 1813, a young man named Chand who lived on the banks of the Madhumati River, traveled to the Kamakhya Temple of Assam where he studied magic. Returning to Boalmari in the form of a crocodile to show off his talent. He muttered a few sounds in a pot of water which he told his wife that if sprinkled on his body, he would become a human again. However, his wife fainted in fear. The locals then brought out sticks with the intention of killing Chand. Moving around in fear, the pot of water accidentally spilled on Chand's tail causing his tail to take a human form. After this, the locals realized that this was not a crocodile, but it was actually Chand. In a crocodile-humanoid state, Chand retreated to the Madhumati River where he continued his life. One day, a British colonial officer shot Chand and killed him, causing him to drown in the Madhumati River. In the memory of this incident, a ferry ghat, beel, mouza, and post office in Boalmari were named Nader Chand after the crocodile-man Chand. The beel is located in southern Boalmari, just south of Gunbaha.

Demographics
As of the 1991 Bangladesh census, Boalmari has a population of 190159. Males constitute 50.63% of the population, and females 49.37%. This Upazila's eighteen+ population is 94073.  The vast majority of Boalmari Upazila's inhabitants are Bengali Muslims.

Education and facilities
The average literacy rate of Boalmari Upazila is 27% (7+ years), and a national average of 32.4% is literate. In Boalmari Upazila, there are 7 Colleges, 12 High Schools, 12 Alia madrasas, 118 Furqania madrasas, 9 Hafizia madrasas and 6 Qawmi Madrasahs. Out of its 480 mosques, the Satoir Jame Mosque is notable.

Administration
Boalmari Upazila is divided into Boalmari Municipality and 11 union parishads: Boalmari, Chandpur, Chatul, Dadpur, Ghoshpur, Gunbaha, Moyna, Parameshwardi, Rupapat, Satair, and Shekhar. The union parishads are subdivided into 173 mauzas and 251 villages.

Boalmari Municipality is subdivided into 9 wards and 18 mahallas.

List of chairmen

Notable residents 

 Shah Mohammad Abu Zafar; Bir Muktijoddha  MP, (est. Shah Zafar Technical College)    
 Md. Abdur Rouf Miah; Bir Muktijoddha, MP, Educationist (est. Bangabandhu College)  
 Syeda Rubaiyat Hossain, Syed Abul Hossain's daughter.

See also
 Upazilas of Bangladesh
 Districts of Bangladesh
 Divisions of Bangladesh

References

Upazilas of Faridpur District